Ebodina lithoptila is a species of moth of the family Tortricidae. It is found in Madagascar.

Habitat 
Ebodina lithoptila thrives in Madagascar's subtropical climate.

References

Moths described in 1960
Polyorthini
Moths of Madagascar
Moths of Africa